Michel Vuillermoz (born 18 December 1962) is a French actor and scriptwriter.

Vuillermoz has appeared in more than 100 films and 40 plays.

In 1998, he received two Molière Award: Best Male Newcomer and Best Play for André le Magnifique.

Since 2007, he is one of the Sociétaires of the Comédie-Française.

In 2009, Vuillermoz signed a petition in support of film director Roman Polanski, calling for his release after Polanski was arrested in Switzerland in relation to his 1977 sexual abuse case

Selected filmography

References

External links

1962 births
Living people
French male film actors
French male stage actors
Actors from Orléans
Sociétaires of the Comédie-Française
French National Academy of Dramatic Arts alumni
20th-century French male actors
21st-century French male actors
French male screenwriters
French screenwriters
Musicians from Orléans